Tiradentes is a municipality in the Brazilian state of Minas Gerais. Tiradentes had an estimated population of 10,960, as of 2020. The original village was established in 1702 and became a city on 19 January 1718. In 1889 the city was renamed from Vila de São José do Rio das Mortes in honour of the national hero who was born nearby.

It has been acclaimed as an unspoiled example of Portuguese colonial architecture.

Other historical cities in Minas Gerais are Ouro Preto, São João del-Rei, Diamantina, Mariana, Congonhas and Sabará.

Geography 
According to the modern (2017) geographic classification by Brazil's National Institute of Geography and Statistics (IBGE), the municipality belongs to the Immediate Geographic Region of São João del-Rei, in the Intermediate Geographic Region of Barbacena.

Ecclesiastical circumscription 
The municipality is part of the Roman Catholic Diocese of São João del-Rei.

See also
 A section of the Estrada de Ferro Oeste de Minas narrow gauge railway from São João del-Rei to Tiradentes has been preserved as a tourist line.

References

External links 

Municipalities in Minas Gerais
1702 establishments in the Portuguese Empire